Thusitha Jayasundera (born 1971) is a Sri Lankan actress who lives in the United Kingdom. She attended an all-girls school run by Australian missionaries, and graduated from the Royal Academy of Dramatic Art in 1993.

Jayasundera played Tushura 'Tash' Bandara in the BBC hospital drama Holby City for three years from December 1999 to June 2002. She played DS Ramani De Costa in the ITV police drama The Bill from 2003 to 2006, and DS Ayesha Masood in the BBC series Silent Witness.

She appeared in the National Theatre adaptation of Michael Morpurgo's novel, War Horse. In 2009 she appeared in the play Dreams of Violence by Stella Feehily for Out of Joint and Soho Theatre.

In 2015, she played Ros Mahendra in the BBC drama Doctor Foster. On 17 March 2019, Jayasundera appeared in Midsomer Murders in the episode "Death of the Small Coppers".

In December 2020, she was cast in the Amazon Prime Video series The Lord of the Rings: The Rings of Power, which will premiere on 2 September 2022.

References

External links

Dreams of Violence
 RADA

1971 births
Living people
British television actresses
Sri Lankan emigrants to the United Kingdom
Sri Lankan television actresses
Alumni of RADA